Tom Andersen is an American Democratic politician from Oregon who was elected to the Oregon House of Representatives in District 19 in the 2022 election.

References 

Living people
Year of birth missing (living people)
Place of birth missing (living people)
21st-century American politicians
People from Salem, Oregon
Democratic Party members of the Oregon House of Representatives